Intelligent dance music (commonly abbreviated as IDM) is a style of electronic music originating in the early 1990s, defined by idiosyncratic experimentation rather than specific genre constraints. It emerged from the culture and sound palette of electronic and rave music styles such as ambient techno, acid house, Detroit techno and breakbeat; it has been regarded as better suited to home listening than dancing.  Prominent artists associated with it include Aphex Twin, Autechre, Squarepusher, Venetian Snares, Boards of Canada, Telefon Tel Aviv, μ-Ziq, the Black Dog, the Future Sound of London, and Luke Vibert.

The term "intelligent dance music" was likely inspired by the 1992 Warp compilation Artificial Intelligence and is said to have originated in the US in 1993 with the formation of the "IDM list", an electronic mailing list originally chartered for the discussion of English artists appearing on the compilation. The term has been widely criticised and dismissed by most artists associated with it, including Aphex Twin, Autechre, and μ-Ziq. In 2014, music critic Sasha Frere-Jones observed that the term "is widely reviled but still commonly used".

History

Intelligent techno and electronica

In the late 1980s, riding the wave of the acid house and early rave party scenes, UK-based groups such as The Orb and The KLF produced ambient house, a genre that fused house music (particularly acid house) with ambient music. By the early 1990s, the increasingly distinct music associated with dance music experimentation had gained prominence with releases on a variety of mostly UK-based record labels, including Warp (1989), Black Dog Productions (1989), R&S Records (1989), Carl Craig's Planet E, Rising High Records (1991), Richard James's Rephlex Records (1991), Kirk Degiorgio's Applied Rhythmic Technology (1991), Eevo Lute Muzique (1991), General Production Recordings (1989), Soma Quality Recordings (1991), Peacefrog Records (1991), and Metamorphic Recordings (1992).

In 1992, Warp released Artificial Intelligence, the first album in the Artificial Intelligence series. Subtitled "electronic listening music from Warp", the record was a collection of tracks from artists such as Autechre, B12, Black Dog Productions, Aphex Twin and The Orb, under various aliases. This would help establish the ambient techno sound of the early 1990s. Steve Beckett, co-owner of Warp, has said the electronic music that the label was releasing then was targeting a post-club, home-listening audience. Following the success of the Artificial Intelligence series, "intelligent techno" became the favoured term, although ambient—without a qualifying house or techno suffix, but still referring to a hybrid form—was a common synonym.

In the same period (1992–93), other names were also used, such as "art techno", "armchair techno", and "electronica", but all were attempts to describe an emerging offshoot of electronic dance music that was being enjoyed by the "sedentary and stay at home". At the same time, the UK market was saturated with increasingly frenetic breakbeat and sample-laden hardcore techno records that quickly became formulaic. Rave had become a "dirty word", so as an alternative, it was common for London nightclubs to advertise that they were playing "intelligent" or "pure" techno, appealing to a "discerning" crowd that considered the hardcore sound to be too commercial.

In 1993, a number of new "intelligent techno"/"electronica" record labels emerged, including New Electronica, Mille Plateaux, and Ferox Records.

The IDM List
In November 1991, the phrase "intelligent techno" appeared on Usenet in reference to Coil's The Snow EP. Off the Internet, the same phrase appeared in both the U.S. and UK music press in late 1992, in reference to Jam & Spoon's Tales from a Danceographic Ocean and the music of The Future Sound of London. Another instance of the phrase appeared on Usenet in April 1993 in reference to The Black Dog's album Bytes. And in July 1993, in his review of an ethno-dance compilation for NME, Ben Willmott replaced techno with dance music, writing "...current 'intelligent' dance music owes much more to Eastern mantra-like repetition and neo-ambient instrumentation than the disco era which preceded the advent of acid and techno."

Wider public use of such terms on the Internet came in August 1993, when Alan Parry announced the existence of a new electronic mailing list for discussion of "intelligent" dance music: the "Intelligent Dance Music list", or "IDM List" for short.

The first message, sent on 1 August 1993, was entitled "Can Dumb People Enjoy IDM, Too?". A reply from the list server's system administrator and founder of Hyperreal.org Brian Behlendorf, revealed that Parry originally wanted to create a list devoted to discussion of the music on the Rephlex label, but they decided together to expand its charter to include music similar to what was on Rephlex or that was in different genres but which had been made with similar approaches. They picked the word "intelligent" because it had already appeared on Artificial Intelligence and because it connoted being something beyond just music for dancing, while still being open to interpretation.

 Artists that appeared in the first discussions on the list included Autechre, Atom Heart, LFO and Rephlex Records artists such as Aphex Twin, μ-ziq and Luke Vibert; plus artists such as The Orb, Richard H. Kirk and The Future Sound of London, and even artists like System 7, William Orbit, Sabres of Paradise, Orbital, Plastikman and Björk. By the end of 1996, Boards of Canada and the Schematic Records label were among the usual topics of discussion, alongside perennial favourites like Aphex Twin and the Warp repertoire.

, the mailing list was still active.

Artificial Intelligence Vol. 2
Warp's second Artificial Intelligence compilation was released in 1994. The album featured fragments of posts from the IDM mailing list incorporated into typographic artwork by The Designers Republic. Sleeve notes by David Toop acknowledged the genre's multitude of musical and cultural influences and suggested none should be considered more important than any other.

During this period, the electronic music produced by Warp Records artists such as Aphex Twin (an alias of Richard D. James), Autechre, LFO, B12, Seefeel and The Black Dog, gained popularity among electronic music fans, as did music by artists on the Rephlex and Skam labels. Lesser-known artists on the Likemind label and Kirk Degiorgio's A.R.T. and Op-Art labels, including Degiorgio himself under various names (As One, Future/Past and Esoterik), Steve Pickton (Stasis) and Nurmad Jusat (Nuron) also found an audience, along with bigger-name, cross-genre artists like Björk and Future Sound of London.

IDM worldwide
North American audiences welcomed IDM, and by the early to late 1990s many IDM record labels had been founded, including Drop Beat, Isophlux, Suction, Schematic and Cytrax. In Miami, Florida, labels like Schematic, Merck Records, Nophi Recordings and The Beta Bodega Coalition released material by artists such as Phoenecia, Dino Felipe, Machinedrum and Proem. Another burgeoning scene was the Chicago/Milwaukee area, with labels such as Addict, Chocolate Industries, Hefty and Zod supporting artists like Doormouse, TRS-80, Telefon Tel Aviv and Emotional Joystick. Tigerbeat 6, a San Francisco-based label has released IDM from artists such as Cex, Kid 606 and Kevin Blechdom.

In 2007, Igloo Magazine observed that "IDM as we knew it is a distant memory, with reminders from the big names now depressingly infrequent, however IDM as we now know it is very much alive, albeit in a less influential and popular, but still respectable form", with a third wave of artist having become active around 2004.

In 2018, Fact Magazine puts the focus on Miami as a central importer/exporter of IDM in the United States. The talent coming out of Miami included the likes of Richard Devine (Schematic/Warp), Alpha 606, Prefuse-73 (Schematic/Warp), Push Button Objects, Otto von Schirach (Schematic) and many more. In 1993, Romulo Del Castillo and Omar Clemetson (Supersoul) began producing both trip hop and IDM. 2 years later Del Castillo and Josh Kay would later form the duo Soul Oddity, which would eventually release their debut album Tone Capsule on Astralwerks (an EMI subsidiary) in 1996.

Criticism of the term
British electronic music and techno artists, including Aphex Twin, Cylob, and Mike Paradinas (A.K.A. μ-Ziq), have criticised the term IDM. Paradinas has stated that the term IDM was only used in North America. Criticism is dominated by the use of the term "intelligent" in the genre name, and also often calls attention to the fact that artists working under this name often produce music that is not easy to dance to.

AllMusic Guide describes the IDM name asA loaded term meant to distinguish electronic music of the '90s and later that's equally comfortable on the dancefloor as in the living room, IDM (Intelligent Dance Music) eventually acquired a good deal of negative publicity, not least among the legion of dance producers and fans whose exclusion from the community prompted the question of whether they produced "Stupid" dance music. In a September 1997 interview, Aphex Twin commented on the 'Intelligent Dance Music' label:
I just think it's really funny to have terms like that. It's basically saying 'this is intelligent and everything else is stupid.' It's really nasty to everyone else's music. (laughs) It makes me laugh, things like that. I don't use names. I just say that I like something or I don't.
Aphex Twin's Rephlex records official overarching genre name is Braindance, of which Dave Segal of Stylus Magazine asked whether it was a "snide dig at IDM's mockworthy Intelligent Dance Music tag?"

Kid 606 has said,It's a label invented by PR companies who need catchphrases. I like sounds, but hate what people attach to sounds.

Matmos has remarked on Perfect Sound Forever that
I belong to the weblist called "IDM" and occasionally enjoy the discussions there, because I like some of the artists who get lassoed into that category (not to mention that we, occasionally, are lumped into that category too), and because you can occasionally find out about interesting records on that list... Matmos is IDM if that only means "might be talked about on the IDM list"- but I don't endorse that term "intelligent dance music" because it's laughable.

In a 2016 interview with Resident Advisor, Sean Booth of Autechre said that, All these things about us being "intelligent" and the term "IDM" are just silly. I'm not a particularly intelligent person, me. I'm diligent, I'm pretty hardworking, but I'm not that clever. I ain't got any qualifications, I just pick up stuff that I think is interesting at the time...There was also the "Artificial Intelligence" tag that Warp coined, but to me as a listener that never seemed to be saying "this is more intelligent." It was just a signifier of it being sci-fi music...Thing is, almost all the artists on that first AI compilation are just like us, they were regular kids, they're not intelligent people particularly. Richard [D. James] is a fucking blagger, Richie Hawtin too... I don't know how the fuck he gets away with the things he does! 

Responding to some of these criticisms, Mike Brown of Hyperreal.org commented in 2018, Even in '93 to 4' the word "IDM" wasn't something any of us took seriously. It was just three letters with no particular meaning beyond our little nerdy community's way of referring to whatever music we liked from the fringes of electronic dance music. No one was intending to coin a genre name or to imply the artists and fans were geniuses.

See also

 Folktronica
 Glitch
 List of electronic music genres
 List of IDM artists

References

Further reading
Ramsay, Ben. "Tools, Techniques and Composition: Bridging Acousmatic and IDM." eContact! 14.4 – TES 2011: Toronto Electroacoustic Symposium / Symposium électroacoustique de Toronto (March 2013). Montréal: CEC.
Reynolds, S., Energy Flash: a Journey Through Rave Music and Dance Culture, Pan Macmillan, 1998 [also published in abridged form as Generation Ecstasy: Into the World of Techno and Rave Culture, Routledge, New York 1999].

External links
The Intelligent Dance Music Mailing List – list info
 Archive of posts to The IDM Mailing List (1993–2008)
 original list announcement on alt.rave, 8 August 1993

 Last.fm group for IDM artist discussion 

Electronica
Experimental music genres
British styles of music
1993 introductions
Dance music genres